Mohamed El Assri (born August 28, 1975) is a Moroccan judoka, who played for the middleweight category. He won a total of five medals (one silver and four bronze) for his division at the African Judo Championships (2004, 2005, 2006, 2008, and 2011). He also captured a silver medal in the 66 kg class at the 2009 Mediterranean Games in Pescara, Italy, losing out to Greece's Ilias Iliadis.

El Assri represented Morocco at the 2008 Summer Olympics in Beijing, where he competed for the men's middleweight class (90 kg). He lost his first preliminary match by a yuko and a deashi harai (advanced foot sweep) to Algeria's Amar Benikhlef. Because his opponent advanced further into the final match, El Assri offered another shot for the bronze medal by defeating Spain's David Alarza in the repechage rounds. He finished only in ninth place, after losing out the second repechage bout to Switzerland's Sergei Aschwanden, who successfully scored a koka and a go-outside-contest-area technique (P16), at the end of the five-minute period.

References

External links

NBC 2008 Olympics profile

1975 births
Living people
Moroccan male judoka
Olympic judoka of Morocco
Judoka at the 2008 Summer Olympics
Mediterranean Games silver medalists for Morocco
Competitors at the 2009 Mediterranean Games
Mediterranean Games medalists in judo
20th-century Moroccan people
21st-century Moroccan people